The Free Component Library, abbreviated FCL, is a software component library for Free Pascal.

The FCL consists of a collection of units that provide components and classes for general programming tasks. Although it is intended to be compatible with Delphi's Visual Component Library (VCL) the FCL is restricted to non-visual components. On the other hand, its functionality partly exceeds that of the VCL.

Visual components are provided by the Lazarus Component Library (LCL).

The FCL is based on the Free Pascal Runtime Library (RTL).

Further reading

External links 
 FCL documentation in the Free Pascal Wiki
 Complete online reference

Free Pascal
Pascal (programming language) libraries
Computer libraries
Component-based software engineering
Platform-sensitive development